Yoyo or YOYO may refer to:

Arts, entertainment, and media

Characters
 hoops&Yoyo, a pair of animated characters featured on Hallmark Cards
 Yoyo the Dodo, a character in the 1938 animated short film Porky in Wackyland

Music
 "YoYo" (song), a 2014 song by Nikki Ambers
 Yoyo A Go Go, a rock music festival in Olympia, Washington, United States

Biology
 Yoyo loach, a freshwater fish

Businesses and organizations
 YoYo Games, a British software development company

People
 Yoyo Chen (born 1981), Hong Kong actress
 Yoyo Díaz (1909–1989), Cuban baseball player
 Yoyo Mung, Hong Kong actress
 Yohannes "Yoyo" Bahçecioğlu (born 1988), German-Turkish former football player

Other uses
 YOYO economics ("You're on Your Own" economics), a type of economic policy

See also
 Yo-yo (disambiguation)
 Yo (disambiguation)
 Yo-yo, a toy